Abd al-Jabbar may refer to:
 Abd al-Jabbar (name)

Places
Sidi Abdeldjebar, Algeria
Abd ol-Jabbar, East Azerbaijan Province, Iran